Alexandre Gavard (25 March 1845 – 29 November 1898) was a Swiss politician and President of the Swiss Council of States (1887/88).  He taught in Carouge 1864–1872.

Rue Alexandre-Gavard in Carouge is named after him.

References

External links 
 
 

Members of the Council of States (Switzerland)
Presidents of the Council of States (Switzerland)
1845 births
1898 deaths
People from Carouge